Rocky Bay may refer to:

 Rocky Bay Formation, geological formation in Bermuda
 Rocky Bay, New Zealand, in Whitireia Park
 Rocky Bay (Newfoundland and Labrador), Canada
 Rocky Bay, Nova Scotia, Canada
 Rocky Bay (Queensland), Australia, on Magnetic Island
 Rocky Bay (South Georgia), British Overseas Territory

See also
 Rocky Cove, Maxwell Bay, King George Island, Antarctica
 Rocky River (Alaska); flows into Rocky Bay
 Rocky Boy (disambiguation)
 Rottnest Island; has a feature named Rocky Bay